Project Runway Season 15 is the fifteenth season of the television show Project Runway, appearing on Lifetime. The season began on September 15, 2016, and attracted 1.72 million total viewers. There are 16 designers competing to become "the next great American designer." 
Supermodel Heidi Klum, Marie Claire creative director Nina Garcia, and fashion designer Zac Posen are all returning as judges this season. Tim Gunn maintains his role as the workroom mentor.

In May 2016, Lifetime renewed Project Runway for three more seasons (16, 17 and 18) in a deal with The Weinstein Company.

Designers 
Sources:

Models 

 Anna Buckles
 Alla Z. Roldan
 Alysia Beckford
 Britt Brooks
 Juanita B. Bledman
 Karina Villa
 Chekesha Keke Johnson 
 Kristy B. Kautious
 Lais Scheffler
 Meandra Nel
 Paola Horber
 Priscilla Cox
 Sherica Maynard
 Stacy Anderson
 Theresa Hess
 Tirzah Evora

Extra Models for the 2 Part Finale 

 Ji Young Baek (Part 1)
 Ya Bi (Part 1)

Designer Progress 

 The designer won Project Runway Season 15.
 The designer advanced to Fashion Week.
 The designer won the challenge.
 The designer came in second but did not win the challenge.
 The designer had one of the highest scores for that challenge, but did not win.
 The designer had one of the lowest scores for that challenge, but was not eliminated.
 The designer was in the bottom two, but was not eliminated.
 The designer lost and was eliminated from the competition.
 The designer lost, but was brought back to the competition by Tim Gunn.

 The model won Project Runway Season 15.
 The model wore the winning designer for that challenge.
 The model wore the 2nd best designer for that challenge.
 The model wore the 3rd best designer for that challenge.
 The model wore one of the lowest score designers for that challenge, but was not eliminated.
 The model wore the 2nd to the lowest score designer, but was not eliminated.
 The model wore the losing design that challenge.
 The model was eliminated.

Designer Legend
Alex Snyder: AS
Brik Allen: BA
Cornelius Ortiz: CO
Dexter Simmons: DS
Erin Robertson: ER
Ian Hargrove: IH
Jenni Riccetti: JR
Kimber Richardson: KR
Laurence Basse: LB
Linda Marcus: LM
Mah-Jing Wong: MJ
Nathalia JMag: NJ
Rik Villa: RV
Roberi Parra: RP
Sarah Donofrio: SD
Tasha Henderson: TH

Episodes

Episode 0: Road to the Runway 
Original airdate: September 15, 2016

 Host Tim Gunn introduced season 15’s designers including home and closet tours.

Episode 1: An Unconventional Launch Party 
Original airdate: September 15, 2016

 The 16 designers were tasked to create an outfit that incorporated “the spirit, the aura and the vibe” of the launch party. This was an unconventional materials challenge with the party decorations serving as the materials. 
 Guest Judge: Savannah Guthrie
 WINNER: Erin 
 ELIMINATED: Ian

Episode 2: Just Fabulous! 
Original airdate: September 22, 2016

 In one day and with $150, contestants designed a look for the everyday woman. The winning look was reproduced and sold on JustFab.com.
 Guest Judge: Nina Dobrev
 WINNER: Laurence 
 ELIMINATED: Linda

Episode 3: Blacklight or Daylight? 
Original airdate: September 29, 2016

Contestants designed a look that would be shown under a black light on the runway.
 Guest Judge: Jaime King
 WINNER: Erin
 ELIMINATED: Kimber

Episode 4: Sink or Swim 
Original airdate: October 6, 2016

 In one day contestants designed a swimsuit and cover up. The winning look was reproduced and sold as part of Heidi Klum's swim collection.
 Guest Judge: Lucky Blue Smith
 WINNER: Rik 
 ELIMINATED: Sarah

Episode 5: There's No "I" in "Team" 
Original airdate: October 13, 2016

The designers were split in to two teams of six to create a four piece mini collection. Each team's budget was determined by their pitch to a group of investors, the judges, who each had $1,000 to invest. Each member of the winning team received $5,000 from Mary Kay.

 Team Unity was given $800 and House of Bouton was given $2,200
 House of Bouton was the winning team
 Guest Judge: Sabrina Carpenter
 WINNER: Dexter 
 ELIMINATED: Alex

Episode 6: There IS Crying in Fashion 
Original airdate: October 20, 2016
 While attending a press cocktail party, the designers are challenged with creating a cocktail dress inspired by the party venue. 
 Guest Judge: Emily Ratajkowski
 WINNER: Jenni 
 ELIMINATED: Tasha

Episode 7: Welcome to the Urban Jungle 
Original airdate: October 27, 2016
 The designers take a trip to Universal Studios theme park in Florida. They are then tasked to create a look inspired by the ride "Skull Island Reign of Kong" to create street wear looks.
 Guest Judges: Rebecca Minkoff and Carly Chaikin
 WINNER: Laurence
 ELIMINATED: Brik

Episode 8: Project Pop Up 
Original airdate: November 3, 2016
 The designers were split into three teams of three and tasked to create a collection inspired by one of the Sally Beauty colors. They presented the final collections in a Pop-Up Shop in downtown New York City. The public was allowed to voted on their favorite looks which accounted for 20% of the teams' final judging score. Team Neutral received the most votes from the public while Team Blue impressed the judges more and were deemed the best of the week.

 Guest Judge: Kelly Osbourne
 WINNER: Roberi
 SAVED:  Cornelius

Episode 9: Life is Full of Surprises
Original airdate: November 10, 2016
 The designers are pleasantly surprised when each one of them is visited by a special guest from home. But the emotional reunions with their mothers, daughters, and friends are quickly overshadowed by the drama of the next challenge when the designers learn that their newly arrived loved ones will also be their clients—and there is $50,000 on the line!
 Guest Judges: Olivia Culpo and Katia Beauchamp
 WINNER: Rik
 ELIMINATED:  Jenni

Episode 10: A Power Trip
Original airdate: November 17, 2016
After having a helicopter flight over New York, the designers were tasked to create a high-fashion editorial look for a powerful woman, inspired by their flight. The winning look will be featured in a spread in Marie Claire magazine.
 Guest Judges: Anne Fulenwider and Camilla Belle
WINNER: Cornelius
ELIMINATED: Nathalia and Dexter

Episode 11: Bold Innovation
Original airdate: December 1, 2016
The first-ever hybrid challenge tasks the clothiers to fashion innovative avant-garde looks by using unconventional fabric and conventional metal-themed materials. Included: a memorable runway.
 Guest Judges: Shiri Appleby
WINNER: Erin
ELIMINATED: Mah-Jing

Episode 12: An Unconventional Trip 
Original airdate: December 8, 2016

 New York Fashion Week is just around the corner, but the designers are reminded that this is the last challenge before the finale. A major surprise is in order for the designers, they're going to Austin Texas! Once they arrive, they are informed that the next challenge is an unconventional one and encouraged to really think outside the box as they pursue a general store for supplies. After they visit Stubb's Barbecue Store for Austin memorabilia. Back in New York, they all seem to be second-guessing themselves and, of course, there's yet another twist. Tim tells the designers they must also craft a second look to go along with their first creation and not all the designers have time working on their side.
 Guest Judge: Georgina Chapman and Priyanka Chopra
 WINNER: Roberi 
 ELIMINATED: Cornelius

Episode 13: Finale Part 1 
Original airdate: December 15, 2016
 It's the final four and they are on their way to New York Fashion Week. Commencing their 10 piece collections each designer is given $9000. Visiting the designers at home, Tim Gunn is not impressed with everything they've created so far; the designers return to New York and present three pieces from their collections; Michael Kors returns as a guest judge.
 Guest Judge: Michael Kors

Episode 14: Finale Part 2 
Original airdate: December 22, 2016
 The final four designers present their collections New York Fashion Week.
 Guest Judge: Zendaya
 WINNER: Erin
 ELIMINATED: Roberi (2nd place), Laurence (3rd place), Rik (4th place)

Episode 15: Season 15 Reunion 
Original airdate: December 29, 2016
 The designers reunite to sew up Season 15 as they reflect on the highs, lows and memorable moments from their time on the show. Host: Tim Gunn.

References

External links 
 Project Runway Season 15 Official Website
 
 JustFab's website

Season 15
2016 American television seasons
2016 in fashion